The Sotiates were a Gallic-Aquitani tribe dwelling in the region surrounding the modern town of Sos (Lot-et-Garonne) during the Iron Age and the Roman period.

They were subjugated in 56 BC by the Roman forces of Caesar's legatus P. Licinius Crassus.

Name 
They are mentioned as Sotiates (var. sontiates, sociates) by Caesar (mid-1st c. BC), and as Sottiates by Pliny (1st c. AD).

The meaning of the ethnonym Sotiates remains unclear. The suffix is possibly the Gaulish -ates ('belonging to'), which appears in the names of many Gallic tribes across Europe (e.g., Atrebates, Nantuates, Caeracates). The origin of the first element Soti- is still unknown.

The city of Sos, attested in the 1st c. BC  as oppidum Sotiatum ('oppidum of the Sotiates'; archidiaconatus Socientis in the late 13th c. AD) is named after the ancient tribe.

Geography 
The Sotiates dwelled north of the Elusates and Tarusates, south of the Oscidates, west of the Lactorates, and east of the Cocosates.

Their pre-Roman chief town was the oppidum Sotiatum (Sot(t)ium; modern Sos), located at the confluence of the Gueyze and Gélise rivers.

History 
The Sotiates are mentioned in two classical sources: Caesar's Bellum Gallicum and Cassius Dio's History of Rome.

Gallic Wars (58–50 BC) 
In 56 BC, the Sotiates were led by their chief Adiatuanos in the defence of their oppidum against the Roman officer P. Licinius Crassus. After a failed sortie attempt with 600 of his soldurii, Adiatuanos had to capitulate to the Romans.

Culture 
The ethnic identity of the Sotiates is debated. Their lifestyle was very similar to that of the Gauls, which led some scholars to postulate that they were originally a Gallic people that had settled at the frontier of Aquitania. In the mid-first century BC, led by their chief Adiatuanos, the Sotiates fought alone against the Roman armies of Crassus, whereas other Aquitani tribes had formed a coalition against the foreign invader. Furthermore, the name Adiatuanos is probably related to the Gaulish root adiantu- ('eagerness, desire, ambition'; perhaps cognate with the Middle Welsh add-iant 'wish'), and thus may be translated as 'zealously striving (for rulership)'.Caesar mentions that their chief was protected by a troop of 600 men named soldurii, which could be a Latinized form of Gaulish *soldurio- ('body-guard, loyal, devoted') according to Xavier Delamarre and Pierre-Yves Lambert. Theo Vennemann argues on the contrary that the term may be of Aquitanian (Vasconic) origin, since it is used by the local people (illi), and that the first element of sol-durii could be related to the Basque zor ('debt'). In any case, the soldurii of Adiatuanos were probably involved in a patron-client relationship that has been compared to the Gallic ambactus, and the size of his army (600 men) illustrates the concentration of a personal power ruling over different clans.

The Sotiates may be also interpreted as an Aquitanian tribe that had been Celticized before Caesar's coming in the region. A sword found in a funeral near Sotiatum, dated to the 3rd century BC, attests the diffusion of prestigious items of Celtic (La Tène) type among the local population. Joaquín Gorrochategui notes that the province of Aquitania experienced "a profound Gallic influence, which becomes more evident as one moves away from the Pyrenees northwards and eastwards. Evidence of this penetration are the names of Gallic persons and deities, the names of tribes in -ates, and later the Romance toponyms in -ac".

See also 

Aquitani

References 

Aquitani
Gauls

Bibliography